The 2021–22 season was Sunderland's 143rd year in their history and fourth consecutive season in League One. Along with the league, the club competed in the FA Cup, the EFL Cup and the EFL Trophy. The season covers the period from 1 July 2021 to 30 June 2022.

Sunderland finished fifth in the regular season, entering the EFL League One play-offs. They beat Sheffield Wednesday over two legs in the semi-final and Wycombe Wanderers in the final at Wembley to secure a return to the EFL Championship.

First team squad

Pre-season friendlies
Sunderland announced they will play friendlies against Spennymoor Town, Heart of Midlothian, York City, Harrogate Town, Tranmere Rovers and Hull City as part of the club's pre season preparations.

Competitions

League One

League table

Results summary

Results by matchday

Matches
The Black Cats fixtures were released on 24 June 2021.

Play-offs

Sunderland finished 5th in the regular 2021–22 EFL League One season, so were drawn against 4th placed Sheffield Wednesday in the Play-off Semi Final. The first leg took place at the Stadium of Light and the second leg took place at Hillsborough.

FA Cup

Sunderland were drawn at home to Mansfield Town in the first round.

EFL Cup

Sunderland were drawn away to Port Vale, Blackpool, Wigan Athletic, Queens Park Rangers and Arsenal in the first, second, third and fourth rounds and quarter final respectively.

EFL Trophy

Sunderland were drawn into Northern Group F alongside Bradford City, Lincoln City and Manchester United U21s. Two of the three group games were confirmed on July 22.

Player statistics

Appearance summary

|-
! colspan="18" style="background:#dcdcdc; text-align:center"| Goalkeepers

|-
! colspan="18" style="background:#dcdcdc; text-align:center"| Defenders

|-
! colspan="18" style="background:#dcdcdc; text-align:center"| Midfielders

|-
! colspan="18" style="background:#dcdcdc; text-align:center"| Forwards

|}

Goals record

Penalties record

Excludes penalties taken during Penalty shoot-outs.

Assists record

Disciplinary record

Transfers

Transfers in

Loans in

Loans out

Transfers out

References

Sunderland
Sunderland A.F.C. seasons